Dario Rossi (born November 14, 1972 in Alatri) is an Italian professional football coach and a former player. Currently, he is an assistant manager with U.S. Cremonese.

He was on the Serie A squad of A.S. Roma for parts of 5 seasons, in 3 of which he made appearances for the squad (9 games total).

Honours
 Coppa Italia winner: 1990/91.

References

1972 births
Living people
People from Alatri
Italian footballers
Serie A players
Serie B players
A.S. Roma players
Ternana Calcio players
Modena F.C. players
U.S. Lecce players
Ascoli Calcio 1898 F.C. players
S.P.A.L. players
Montevarchi Calcio Aquila 1902 players
Pisa S.C. players
Delfino Pescara 1936 players
Frosinone Calcio players
S.S. Chieti Calcio players
Vis Pesaro dal 1898 players
S.S. Juve Stabia managers
Italian football managers
Association football defenders
Footballers from Lazio
Sportspeople from the Province of Frosinone